Theodore Walter Sepkowski, born Szepkowski (November 9, 1923 – March 8, 2002) was an American professional baseball player.

Born in Baltimore, Maryland, he played outfield and three infield positions as a minor leaguer, and appeared in 19 Major League Baseball games as a utility player for the Cleveland Indians (–) and New York Yankees.

Sepkowski's active career extended from 1942–1955, with the 1943–1945 seasons missed because of service in the United States Coast Guard during World War II. He broke into the game with his hometown Baltimore Orioles of the International League, then a Cleveland farm club, and saw his first action in the Majors on September 9, 1942, when he was Cleveland's starting second baseman in a 5–4 defeat at the hands of the Philadelphia Athletics. Sepkowski collected his first MLB hit in five at bats that day but made two errors in the field.

He spent most of 1946 with the Double-A Oklahoma City Indians before another late-season recall, then started 1947 with Cleveland before his contract was sold to the Yankees on June 3. He appeared in two games for the Yanks as a pinch runner, then returned to the minors for the remainder of his career. As a Major Leaguer he appeared as a third baseman and second baseman for two games each, and as a right fielder in one contest.  His six MLB hits included two doubles.

References

External links

1923 births
2002 deaths
Atlanta Crackers players
Baltimore Orioles (IL) players
Baseball players from Baltimore
Cleveland Indians players
Erie Senators players
Hartford Chiefs players
Kansas City Blues (baseball) players
Major League Baseball right fielders
Major League Baseball second basemen
Major League Baseball third basemen
Milwaukee Brewers (minor league) players
Minor league baseball managers
Newark Bears (IL) players
New York Yankees players
Oklahoma City Indians players
Springfield Cubs players
Wellsville Braves players
United States Coast Guard personnel of World War II